The Santa Clara Valley Open Space Authority (OSA) is an independent special district in Santa Clara County, California, U.S. A bill signed by Governor Wilson in 1992, SB2027, created the district as the Santa Clara County Open Space Preserve as of February 1, 1993. In 2015, Governor Jerry Brown signed California Senate Bill SB422 to rename the authority with "Valley" instead of "County." The OSA serves areas of the county outside the Midpeninsula Regional Open Space District with the exception of Gilroy. The OSA uses $4.2 million per year from a $12-per-parcel property-tax assessment to hire rangers and to open land to the public.

The Open Space Authority currently owns or manages the following properties:
Sierra Vista Open Space Preserve
Coyote Ridge Open Space Preserve
Coyote Valley Open Space Preserve
Rancho Cañada del Oro Open Space Preserve

References

External links 

Government in the San Francisco Bay Area
Open Space Authority
Park districts in California
Protected areas of Santa Clara County, California